The Cladagh River ( or "washing river"), Claddagh or Swanlinbar River, is a moderately large river which forms from a number of small streams rising in Commas townland on the south-eastern slopes of Cuilcagh Mountain, County Cavan, and flows through the village of Swanlinbar, before crossing the border into County Fermanagh and eventually flowing into Upper Lough Erne. It is ultra-oligotrophic upstream before gradually becoming oligotrophic and oligo-mesotrophic through its middle and lower reaches.

Environment
The river is a designated Special Area of Conservation. The vegetation includes Ranunculetum fluitantis, Callitriche and Ranunculus peltatus. The  river contains one of the largest surviving  populations in Northern Ireland of the freshwater pearl mussel. The mussels, estimated to be a minimum of 10,000 in number, are confined to a  stretch of undisturbed river in the middle section.

See also 
 Rivers of Ireland
 List of rivers of Northern Ireland

References 

Cladagh
Cladagh
Cladagh